Gary Daugherty was a Republican member of the Illinois House from the 66th district from January 5, 2021, to January 13, 2021. The 66th district, located in the Chicago area, includes all or parts of Algonquin, Carpentersville, Crystal Lake, East Dundee, Elgin, Gilberts, Huntley, Lake in the Hills, Lakewood, Sleepy Hollow, and West Dundee.

Daugherty was appointed as a representative in the 101st General Assembly after the resignation of defeated incumbent Allen Skillicorn on January 5, 2021. Daugherty was replaced in the 102nd General Assembly by Suzanne Ness, who won the general election in 2020 against former representative Skillicorn.

References

21st-century American politicians
Illinois Republicans
Living people
Year of birth missing (living people)
Date of birth missing (living people)